Axel Schaumann (born 4 July 1961 in Stuttgart) is a retired West German hurdler.

He finished fourth at the European Indoor Championships in both 1982 and 1983.

He became West German champion in 1983, representing the sports club LG Kappelberg.

International competitions

References

1961 births
Living people
West German male hurdlers
Sportspeople from Stuttgart